1975 London bombing may refer to:

Scott's Oyster Bar bombing
London Hilton bombing
Green Park tube station bombing
Walton's Restaurant bombing
Trattoria Fiore bombing